Lepidogma chlorophilalis is a species of snout moth in the genus Lepidogma. It was described by George Hampson in 1912 and is known from Sri Lanka.

References

Moths described in 1912
Epipaschiinae